Gavardo is a town and comune in the province of Brescia, in Lombardy. As of 2011 Gavardo had a population of 11,786.

Cyclist Marco Frapporti and Italian football striker Cristiana Girelli were born here.

Sources

Cities and towns in Lombardy